This article shows statistics of the club's players in the season.

In the 2003-2004 season Trabzonspor arrived second in Süper Lig.
The top goalscorer of the team was Gökdeniz Karadeniz who scored 14 goals.

Sponsor
Fly Air

Players
Fatih Tekke
Hüseyin Çimşir
Hasan Üçüncü
Gökdeniz Karadeniz
Mehmet Kahriman
Tayfun Cora
Alişen Kandil
Mehmet Yılmaz
Erdinç Yavuz
Michael Petkovic
Mustafa Yalçınkaya
Oumar Dieng
Tolga Zengin
Ibrahima Yattara
Emrah Eren
İbrahim Ege
Augustine Ahinful
Maxim Romashchenko
Karel D'Haene
Göksel Yaman
Hasan Sönmez
Recep Asil

Super Lig

Turkish Cup

First round

|}

Second round

|}

Quarterfinals

|}

Semifinals

|}

Final

|}

See also
Süper Lig 2003–04
2003–04 Turkish Cup

External links

Turkish football clubs 2003–04 season
Trabzonspor seasons